El Abadengo is a subcomarca in the comarca of Vitigudino in the province of Salamanca, Castile and León.  It contains 14 municipalities: Ahigal de los Aceiteros, Bañobárez, Bermellar, Bogajo, Cerralbo, Fuenteliante, La Fregeneda, Hinojosa de Duero, Lumbrales, Olmedo de Camaces, La Redonda, San Felices de los Gallegos, Sobradillo and Villavieja.

References 

Comarcas of the Province of Salamanca